The United States competed at the 1956 Summer Olympics in Melbourne, Australia. 297 competitors, 251 men and 46 women, took part in 139 events in 18 sports.

Medalists

Gold
Bobby Morrow — Athletics, Men's 100 metres
Bobby Morrow — Athletics, Men's 200 metres
Charles Jenkins — Athletics, Men's 400 metres
Tom Courtney — Athletics, Men's 800 metres
Lee Calhoun — Athletics, Men's 110m Hurdles
Glenn Davis — Athletics, Men's 400m Hurdles 
Thane Baker, Leamon King, Bobby Morrow, and Ira Murchison — Athletics, Men's 4 × 100 m Relay 
Tom Courtney, Charles Jenkins, Lou Jones, and Jesse Mashburn — Athletics, Men's 4 × 400 m Relay 
Charles Dumas — Athletics, Men's High Jump
Bob Richards — Athletics, Men's Pole Vault
Greg Bell — Athletics, Men's Long Jump
Parry O'Brien — Athletics, Men's Shot Put
Harold Connolly — Athletics, Men's Hammer Throw
Milt Campbell — Athletics, Men's Decathlon
Millie McDaniel — Athletics, Women's High Jump  
Al Oerter — Athletics, Men's Discus Throw 
Dick Boushka, Carl Cain, Chuck Darling, William Evans, Gib Ford, Burdette Haldorson, Bill Hougland, Bob Jeangerard, K C Jones, Bill Russell, Ron Tomsic, and Jim Walsh — Basketball, Men's Team Competition 
Jim Boyd — Boxing, Men's Light Heavyweight
Pete Rademacher — Boxing, Men's Heavyweight
Bob Clotworthy — Diving, Men's Springboard 
Pat McCormick — Diving, Women's Springboard 
Pat McCormick — Diving, Women's Platform
Jim Fifer and Duvall Hecht — Rowing, Men's Coxless Pairs 
Dan Ayrault, Conn Findlay, and Kurt Seiffert — Rowing, Men's Coxed Pairs 
William Becklean, Donald Beer, Thomas Charlton, John Cooke, Caldwell Esselstyn, Charles Grimes, Robert Morey, Rusty Wailes, and David Wight — Rowing, Men's Eights 
William Yorzyk — Swimming, Men's 200m Butterfly 
Shelley Mann — Swimming, Women's 100m Butterfly 
Charles Vinci — Weightlifting, Men's Bantamweight
Isaac Berger — Weightlifting, Men's Featherweight
Tommy Kono — Weightlifting, Men's Light Heavyweight 
Paul Edward Anderson — Weightlifting, Men's Heavyweight
Lawrence Low and Bert Williams — Sailing, Men's Star

Silver
Thane Baker — Athletics, Men's 100 metres
Andy Stanfield — Athletics, Men's 200 metres
Jack Davis — Athletics, Men's 110m Hurdles
Eddie Southern — Athletics, Men's 400m Hurdles
Bob Gutowski — Athletics, Men's Pole Vault
John Bennett — Athletics, Men's Long Jump
Bill Nieder — Athletics, Men's Shot Put 
Fortune Gordien — Athletics, Men's Discus Throw 
Rafer Johnson — Athletics, Men's Decathlon 
Willye White — Athletics, Women's Long Jump
José Torres — Boxing, Men's Light Middleweight
Don Harper — Diving, Men's Springboard 
Gary Tobian — Diving, Men's Platform 
Jeanne Stunyo — Diving, Women's Springboard 
Juno Irwin — Diving, Women's Platform 
Bill André, Jack Daniels, and George Lambert — Modern Pentathlon, Men's Team Competition
Pat Costello and Jim Gardiner — Rowing, Men's Double Sculls 
James McIntosh, Art McKinlay, John McKinlay, and John Welchli — Rowing, Men's Coxless Fours 
George Breen, Richard Hanley, Ford Konno, and Bill Woolsey — Swimming, Men's 4 × 200 m Freestyle Relay 
Carin Cone — Swimming, Women's 100m Backstroke 
Nancy Ramey — Swimming, Women's 100m Butterfly 
Shelley Mann, Joan Rosazza, Sylvia Ruuska, and Nancy Simons — Swimming, Women's 4 × 100 m Freestyle Relay 
Peter George — Weightlifting, Men's Middleweight
David Sheppard — Weightlifting, Men's Middle Heavyweight
Daniel Hodge — Wrestling, Men's Freestyle Middleweight

Bronze
Thane Baker — Athletics, Men's 200 metres
Joel Shankle — Athletics, Men's 110m Hurdles
Josh Culbreath — Athletics, Men's 400m Hurdles 
Des Koch — Athletics, Men's Discus Throw 
Isabelle Daniels, Mae Faggs, Margaret Matthews, and Wilma Rudolph — Athletics, Women's 4 × 100 m Relay 
Dick Connor — Diving, Men's Platform 
Paula Jean Myers-Pope — Diving, Women's Platform 
John Kelly — Rowing, Men's Single Sculls 
Offutt Pinion — Shooting, Men's Free Pistol
George Breen — Swimming, Men's 400m Freestyle 
George Breen — Swimming, Men's 1500m Freestyle 
Frank McKinney — Swimming, Men's 100m Backstroke 
Sylvia Ruuska — Swimming, Women's 400m Freestyle 
Mary Sears — Swimming, Women's 100m Butterfly 
James George — Weightlifting, Men's Light Heavyweight 
Peter Blair — Wrestling, Men's Freestyle Light Heavyweight
John Marvin — Sailing, Men's Finn

Athletics

Men's Marathon 
Nick Costes — 2:42:20 (→ 20th place)
John J. Kelley — 2:43:40 (→ 21st place)
Dean Thackwray — did not finish (→ no ranking)

Basketball

Boxing

Canoeing

Cycling

Sprint
Jack Disney — 5th place

Time trial
Allen Bell — 1:12.8 (→ 10th place)

Tandem
Donald FergusonJames Rossi — 8th place

Team pursuit
Allen BellArt LongsjoDavid RhoadsRichard Cortright — 15th place

Individual road race
Joseph Becker — 5:38:16 (→ 43rd place)
David Rhoads — did not finish (→ no ranking)
Erhard Neumann — did not finish (→ no ranking)
George Van Meter — did not finish (→ no ranking)

Diving

Men's 10m Platform
Gary Tobian 
 Preliminary Round — 76.77
 Final — 152.41 (→  Silver Medal)

Richard Connor 
 Preliminary Round — 80.24
 Final — 149.79 (→  Bronze Medal)

William Farrell 
 Preliminary Round — 75.07
 Final — 139.12 (→ 6th place)

Women's 10m Platform
Pat McCormick 
 Preliminary Round — 51.28
 Final — 84.85 (→  Gold Medal)

Juno Stover-Irwin 
 Preliminary Round — 50.81
 Final — 81.64 (→  Silver Medal)

Paula Jean Myers-Pope 
 Preliminary Round — 52.96
 Final — 81.58 (→  Bronze Medal)

Fencing

18 fencers represented the United States in 1956.

Men's foil
 Albie Axelrod
 Hal Goldsmith
 Byron Krieger

Men's team foil
 Albie Axelrod, Daniel Bukantz, Hal Goldsmith, Byron Krieger, Nate Lubell, Sewall Shurtz

Men's épée
 Richard Pew
 Sewall Shurtz
 Kinmont Hoitsma

Men's team épée
 Sewall Shurtz, Richard Pew, Ralph Goldstein, Abram Cohen, Kinmont Hoitsma

Men's sabre
 Allan Kwartler
 George Worth
 Tibor Nyilas

Men's team sabre
 Tibor Nyilas, George Worth, Abram Cohen, Rex Dyer, Allan Kwartler, Norman Cohn-Armitage

Women's foil
 Jan York-Romary
 Maxine Mitchell
 Judy Goodrich

Football (soccer)

Preliminary round
 Lost to Yugoslavia (1-9) → did not advance
Team roster
 John Carden 
 Ronald Coder 
 Bill Conterio
 Rolf Decker 
 Jim Dorrian
 Svend Engedal
 Harry Keough
 Bill Looby
 Alfonso Marina 
 Ruben Mendoza
 Lloyd Monsen
 Ed Murphy
 Dick Packer
 Zenon Snylyk
 Herman Wecke
 Siegbert Wirth 
 Al Zerhusen
Head coach: Jimmy Mills

Gymnastics

Hockey

Team roster
Kurt Ucko

Modern pentathlon

Three pentathletes represented the United States in 1956, winning silver in the team event.

Individual
 George Lambert
 Bill Andre
 Jack Daniels

Team
 George Lambert
 Bill Andre
 Jack Daniels

Rowing

The United States had 26 rowers participate in all seven rowing events in 1956.

 Men's single sculls
 John B. Kelly

 Men's double sculls
 Pat Costello
 Jim Gardiner

 Men's coxless pair
 James Fifer
 Duvall Hecht

 Men's coxed pair
 Dan Ayrault
 Conn Findlay
 Kurt Seiffert (cox)

 Men's coxless four
 John Welchli
 John McKinlay
 Art McKinlay
 James McIntosh

 Men's coxed four
 James Wynne
 Douglas Turner
 James McMullen
 Ronald Cardwell
 Edward Masterson (cox)

 Men's eight
 Thomas Charlton
 David Wight
 John Cooke
 Donald Beer
 Caldwell Esselstyn
 Charles Grimes
 Rusty Wailes
 Robert Morey
 William Becklean (cox)

Sailing

Shooting

Eight shooters represented the United States in 1956. Offutt Pinion won the bronze medal in the 50 m pistol event.

25 m pistol
 John Beaumont
 John Forman

50 m pistol
 Offutt Pinion
 Joe Benner

300 m rifle, three positions
 James Smith
 Herbert Voelcker

50 m rifle, three positions
 Art Jackson
 Verle Wright, Jr.

50 m rifle, prone
 Art Jackson
 Verle Wright, Jr.

Swimming

Water polo

Weightlifting

Wrestling

See also
United States at the 1955 Pan American Games

References

Nations at the 1956 Summer Olympics
1956
Oly